The Women's road race of the 2010 UCI Road World Championships cycling event took place on 2 October in Melbourne, Australia.

For the third time in four years, an Italian rider claimed the gold medal, with Giorgia Bronzini edging out her rivals in a sprint finish. Dutch rider Marianne Vos finished second for her fourth consecutive silver medal in the event, with Emma Johansson of Sweden taking the bronze.

Route
The race covered 127.2 km.

Final classification

References

External links

Women's road race
UCI Road World Championships – Women's road race
2010 in women's road cycling